The Court of Appeals of Virginia, established January 1, 1985, is an intermediate appellate court of 17 judges that hears appeals from decisions of Virginia's circuit courts and the Virginia Workers' Compensation Commission. The Court sits in panels of at least three judges, and sometimes hears cases en banc. Appeals from the Court of Appeals go to the Supreme Court of Virginia.

History 

The need for expanded appellate capacity was first recognized in 1971. The report of the Virginia Court System Study Commission, composed of distinguished legislators and members of the bench and bar, recommended a reorganization plan for a unified court system. The Commission, chaired by former Chief Justice Lawrence W. I'Anson, recognized the need for an intermediate appellate court in Virginia which would absorb the bulk of review of circuit court appeals, while preserving the Supreme Court as a single body concentrating on the development of the law.

In 1978, a comprehensive study of the Virginia court system conducted by the National Center for State Courts also recommended that the appellate capacity of the Virginia courts be increased by creating an intermediate Court of Appeals. In 1982, the Judicial Council of Virginia proposed legislation for a twelve judge intermediate appellate court. Finally, in 1983, the General Assembly created the Court of Appeals of Virginia, effective January 1, 1985. E. Ballard Baker was the first chief judge of the Court of Appeals of Virginia.

Since the establishment of the Court of Appeals, appellate capacity has increased 38.8%. The number of petitions acted upon has risen each year, achieving the desired goal of increasing appellate capacity in the court system.

In March 2021, the Court was expanded from 11 judges to 17 judges.

Judges 

The Court of Appeals consists of 17 judges who are elected for eight-year terms by a majority of the members of each house of the General Assembly. If a vacancy occurs while the General Assembly is not in session, the Governor may appoint a successor to serve until thirty days after the commencement of the next session of the legislature.

The chief judge of the Court of Appeals is elected by a majority vote of the judges of the Court of Appeals to serve a term of four years. The Chief Judge designates where the Court of Appeals will sit in order to provide convenient access to the citizens of the various geographic areas of the state. The Court normally sits in four locations: Alexandria, Chesapeake, Richmond and Salem.

The clerk of the Court of Appeals receives, processes and maintains permanent records of appeals and other official documents filed with the Court.

Panels 

The Court of Appeals sits en banc (or as a whole) in the following circumstances: 
 Where there is a dissent in a panel to which a case was originally assigned and an aggrieved party requests an en banc hearing and at least three other judges of the Court vote in favor of such a hearing. 
 If a judge of a panel certifies that a decision of that panel conflicts with a previous decision of the Court or of any panel and three other judges agree.
 In any case in which a majority of the Court, upon its own motion, determines it is appropriate to sit en banc.

Under these conditions, the Court of Appeals convenes en banc and reconsiders the case. The court sitting en banc may override any previous decision of a panel or the full Court. No fewer than eight judges may be present when Court of Appeals sits en banc.

Jurisdiction 

The Court of Appeals has authority to hear appeals as a matter of right from: 
 any final judgment, order, or decree of a circuit court involving affirmance or annulment of a marriage, divorce, custody, spousal or child support, or control or disposition of a child, as well as other domestic relations cases;
 any final decision of the Virginia Workers' Compensation Commission (a state agency responsible for handling workers' compensation claims);
 any final decision of a circuit court on appeal from a decision of an administrative agency (example: the Department of Health); and
 any interlocutory order granting, dissolving, or denying an injunction or adjudicating the principles of a cause in any of the cases listed above.

The Court of Appeals has authority to consider petitions for appeal from: 
 final orders of conviction in criminal and traffic matters except where a death penalty is imposed.
 final decisions of a circuit court on an application for a concealed weapons permit.
 certain preliminary rulings in felony cases when requested by the Commonwealth. 
The Court of Appeals has original jurisdiction to issue writs of mandamus, prohibition and habeas corpus in any case over which the Court would have appellate jurisdiction.

In addition, the Court of Appeals has original jurisdiction to issue a writ of actual innocence upon petition of a person who has been convicted of a felony upon a plea of not guilty.

Reforms effective January 2022 
As part of a comprehensive reform bill passed by the Virginia General Assembly and signed into law in March 2021, the jurisdiction of the Court of Appeals expanded on January 1, 2022, as follows:

 Litigants can now appeal as of right a lower court's decision in civil cases, and the Supreme Court of Virginia will retain the power to select which appeals it hears.
 Criminal defendants can now appeal as of right a lower court's decision in criminal cases, but the Commonwealth will still need to petition the Court of Appeals if it wishes to appeal a decision in a criminal case.
 The Court of Appeals now has jurisdiction to hear interlocutory appeals and petitions for review of injunctions.

An appeal filed with the Supreme Court of Virginia before January 1, 2022 remains under its jurisdiction.

Procedure 

All criminal cases that are within the Court's jurisdiction and all traffic infraction cases are presented to the Court by petition for appeal. A petition is a formal written application to a court requesting judicial action on a certain matter.

Each petition for appeal in a criminal case is referred to a judge of the Court for review to determine if an appeal should be awarded. The judge may grant the petition for appeal in whole or part. An appellant may request a panel of three judges of the Court of Appeals to review a petition for appeal that was denied, either in whole, or part, by the judge who initially reviewed the petition. As long as oral argument was preserved in the petition for appeal and a reply brief was not filed, the appellant may present oral argument on the petition for appeal before a panel of three judges. Any one of the three judges may grant the petition on the basis of the record without oral argument. If the petition is granted, briefs are filed by both parties. The clerk of the Court of Appeals refers each granted appeal to a panel of the Court. Oral argument is permitted and may be waived.

All other appeals (domestic relations, Virginia Workers' Compensation Commission and those from administrative agencies) are heard as a matter of right. Appeals of right are cases that an appellate court is required to hear. These cases do not go through the petition process. Briefs are filed by both parties and the case is referred by the clerk of the Court to a panel of three judges. Oral argument is permitted and may be waived. The Court may summarily affirm an appeal without oral argument if a panel of three judges determines that it has no merit.

Since January 1, 2022, when the court's jurisdiction expanded, most appeals are initiated by filing a notice of appeal and related documents with the clerk of the Court of Appeals.

Decisions are issued by the Court of Appeals by written opinion or order.

Certification 

In any case in which an appeal has been taken to the Court of Appeals, the Supreme Court may certify the case for review by the Supreme Court before it has been determined by the Court of Appeals. Such certification transfers jurisdiction over the case to the Supreme Court for all purposes. These certifications occur only when the case is of such public importance to require prompt decision by the Supreme Court or when the docket of the Court of Appeals is congested and expeditious administration of justice requires the transfer.

Finality of decisions 

When the Court of Appeals has rejected a petition for appeal, dismissed an appeal, or decided on an appeal, its decision is final, without appeal to the Supreme Court in the following cases:

 Traffic infraction and misdemeanor cases where no incarceration is imposed
 Cases originating before any administrative agency or the Virginia Workers' Compensation Commission and
 Cases involving affirmance or annulment of a marriage, divorce, custody, spousal or child support, cases involving the control or disposition of a juvenile, and all other domestic relations matters.

Notwithstanding the finality of these cases, if the Supreme Court determines on a petition for review that the decision of the Court of Appeals involves a substantial constitutional question as a determinative issue or matters of significant precedential value, review may be had in the Supreme Court.

Review by the Supreme Court of Virginia 

Except where the decisions of the Court of Appeals are final, any party aggrieved by a final decision of the Court of Appeals may petition the Supreme Court for an appeal.

Current composition 
As of November 3, 2021:

Active

Senior

Chief judges

References

External links
 The Court of Appeals of Virginia.

Virginia
Virginia state courts
1985 establishments in Virginia
Courts and tribunals established in 1985